(21 January 1984 - 28 September 2020) was a Japanese rugby union player. Yuhara played 13 international matches for the Japan national rugby union team.

Yuhara was born in Chiba, and a member of the Japan team at the 2011 Rugby World Cup, playing one match against eventual winners the All Blacks.

Yuhara played for Top League team Toshiba Brave Lupus.

Death
He collapsed while working out in the Toshiba Brave Lupus clubhouse and was rushed to hospital where he died.

References

2020 deaths
1984 births
Toshiba Brave Lupus Tokyo players
Japan international rugby union players
Japanese rugby union players
Rugby union hookers